Mason Emerson (born 27 March 1996) is a New Zealand professional rugby union player currently playing for Valence Romans in the Nationale league. He previously played for the Colorado Raptors in Major League Rugby and for Hawkes Bay in the ITM Cup and for New Zealand u20s internationally.

References

External links
itsrugby.co.uk profile

New Zealand rugby union players
1996 births
Living people
People from Hastings, New Zealand
Rugby union wings
Rugby union fullbacks
Hawke's Bay rugby union players
American Raptors players